The Fields is the third album by the American jazz saxophonist Glenn Spearman Double Trio, recorded in 1994 and released on the Italian Black Saint label.

Reception

The Penguin Guide to Jazz notes that "[t]he supporting cast is strong and supportive, though very often the band seem to be playing set charts while the two horns duel in the foreground."

Track listing
All compositions by Spearman except where noted
 "Melts" (Ochs) – 15:11
 "Fields Before the Ram" – 12:39
 "Hot" – 3:39
 "Stepping Out" – 9:39
 "Extrapolation of the Inevitable" – 8:59
 "Just There" (Ochs) – 5:13
 "Sound Section" – 21:11

Personnel
Glenn Spearman – tenor sax
Larry Ochs – tenor sax, sopranino sax
William Winant – drums, tympani
Donald Robinson – drums
Chris Brown – piano
Lisle Ellis – double bass

References

1996 albums
Glenn Spearman albums
Black Saint/Soul Note albums